Ramón Javier Mestre (Córdoba, Argentina,  July 2, 1972), is an Argentinian lawyer and politician for the Unión Cívica Radical. In the elections of September 2011, he was elected mayor of the city of Córdoba, a role he assumed 10 December of that year.

Biography
He is son of Ramón Bautista Mestre (governor of Córdoba from 1995 to 1999; and mayor of the province capital city from 1983 to 1991).

He became lawyer at the University of Córdoba. Between 2006 and 2008 was president of the Capital Committee for the UCR of Córdoba. In 2007 was elected counselor of his city, role that he occupied up to 2009. In December of that year, he started his term as national senator.

On 18 September 2011, he was elected mayor of the city of Córdoba, against the dissident Peronist Olga Riutort (candidate for Alianza Fuerza de la Gente) and former vice-governor Héctor Campana (Unión por Córdoba). He was re-elected for a second term in 2015.

Because of this, the UCR rules the city for the first time since 1999, the year in which Rubén Martí finished his term as mayor.

References

1972 births
National University of Córdoba alumni
Mayors of Córdoba, Argentina
Members of the Argentine Senate for Córdoba
Radical Civic Union politicians
Living people